Heartache Medication is the third studio album by American  neotraditional country artist Jon Pardi. The album was released on September 27, 2019, via Capitol Nashville. Following the success of 2016's California Sunrise, Pardi reteamed with co-producer Bart Butler and brought in Ryan Gore to work on new material for his next country album, carrying traditional content that evoked sad emotions but gave the listener good vibes at the same time. Heartache Medication debuted at numbers two and 11 on the Top Country Albums and Billboard 200 charts, respectively. It has spawned three singles: the title track (his third number-one country hit) and "Ain't Always the Cowboy". and "Tequila Little Time" 
A deluxe version was released on October 2, 2020.

Background
In late 2018 after wrapping up a summer tour with Luke Bryan, Pardi had announced he was taking his time on releasing new music but to expect new music from him in the new year. At the time he hinted at a song written by and hopefully featuring fellow country star Miranda Lambert.

One day after appearing on the 2019 season finale of American Idol, Pardi announced the album. Its lead single, the title track, was released May 20, 2019. Three additional tracks were also previewed ahead of the album's release—"Ain't Always the Cowboy", "Me and Jack", and "Tequila Little Time".

Before the album's release, Pardi stated he named the album Heartache Medication because it contains sad topics intended to make the listener feel good at the same time.

Critical reception

AllMusic's Stephen Thomas Erlewine praised Pardi for using the formula from California Sunrise to craft a track listing filled with odes and nods to traditional country and doesn't give in to the "sentimental streak or his own musical conservatism", concluding that "All of these songs show that Pardi's traditionalism is flexible, and those subtle grace notes help make Heartache Medication the best old-fashioned mainstream country album of 2019."

Commercial performance
Heartache Medication debuted on the Billboard 200 at number 11, and number two on the Top Country Albums chart with 34,000 units, 23,000 of which are in pure album sales. On the Billboard 200, it left the top 100 on the week of November 2, 2019, spending eleven weeks on the chart. The album has sold 52,500 copies in the United States as of March 2020, and 161,000 units in total as of February 2020. In Canada, it debuted and peaked at number 18 on the Canadian Albums chart for the week of October 11.

Track listing

Personnel
Adapted from the album's liner notes.

Vocals
Lauren Alainafeatured vocals (track 6)
Jeff Hydebackground vocals (track 1)
Jon Pardilead vocals (all tracks), background vocals (tracks 6, 8, 9, 17)
Russell Terrellbackground vocals (all tracks except 9 & 17)

Production

Bart Butlerproducer
Dan Davisassistant engineer
Ryan Goreproducer, mixing
Ted Jensenmastering

Scott Johnsonproduction assistance
Kam Luchterhandassistant engineer
Seth Mortonassistant engineer
Chris Smalldigital editing

Instruments

Dave Cohenaccordion (track 9), Fender Rhodes (track 1), Hammond B-3 organ (tracks 1, 3, 4, 6-8, 15), piano (tracks 2, 3, 7, 10, 13, 16, 17), strings (tracks 7, 13), synthesizer (tracks 16, 17), vibraphone (track 7), Wurlitzer (tracks 5, 6, 9, 15)
Howard Duckpiano (track 12)
Andy Ellisonpedal steel guitar (tracks 1, 5, 13)
Jenee Fleenorfiddle (all tracks except 8)
Lee Francisbass guitar (all tracks)
Ryan Gorepercussion (tracks 1-6, 8-14), programming (tracks 9, 15, 16)
Mike Haynestrumpet (track 9)

Mike Johnsondobro (track 14), pedal steel guitar (tracks 2-4, 6-8, 10-12, 15, 16)
Luke Lairdprogramming (tracks 8, 9), synthesizer (track 9)
John LancasterHammond B-3 organ (track 14), synthesizer (track 14), Wurlitzer (track 11)
Rob McNelleyelectric guitar (all tracks except 17)
Miles McPhersondrums (all tracks), percussion (tracks 1, 2, 5, 7, 9, 10, 12, 15-17), timbales (track 9)
Jon Pardielectric guitar (track 8)
Danny Raderacoustic guitar (all tracks), banjo (track 14), mandolin (track 14)
Derek Wellselectric guitar (track 17)

Imagery
Jon Pardiart direction
Karen Naffart direction and design
Jim Wrightphotography

Charts

Weekly charts

Year-end charts

Certifications

References

2019 albums
Jon Pardi albums
Capitol Records albums